The Tenmile River is an  river in the towns of Hiram and Brownfield in western Maine in the United States. It is a tributary of the Saco River, which flows to the Atlantic Ocean.

See also
List of rivers of Maine

References

Maine Streamflow Data from the USGS
Maine Watershed Data From Environmental Protection Agency

Rivers of Maine
Saco River
Rivers of Oxford County, Maine